Sean Harris (born February 25, 1972 in Tucson, Arizona) is a former American football linebacker in the National Football League. He was drafted by the Chicago Bears in the third round of the 1995 NFL Draft. He played college football at Arizona.

Harris also played for the Indianapolis Colts.

References

1972 births
Living people
American football linebackers
Arizona Wildcats football players
Chicago Bears players
Indianapolis Colts players